Rosa del Carmen Peña Rocamontes (born 19 September 1994) is a Mexican sports shooter. She competed in the Women's 10 metre air rifle event at the 2012 Summer Olympics.

References

External links
 

1994 births
Living people
Mexican female sport shooters
Olympic shooters of Mexico
Shooters at the 2012 Summer Olympics
Sportspeople from Saltillo
Pan American Games medalists in shooting
Pan American Games bronze medalists for Mexico
Medalists at the 2011 Pan American Games
Shooters at the 2011 Pan American Games
21st-century Mexican women